Dunbar is an unincorporated community and census-designated place (CDP) in Georgetown County, South Carolina, United States.  It was first listed as a CDP in the 2020 census with a population of 615.

Geography
Dunbar is located at latitude 33.55 and longitude –79.355. The elevation is 20 feet.

Demographics

2020 census

Note: the US Census treats Hispanic/Latino as an ethnic category. This table excludes Latinos from the racial categories and assigns them to a separate category. Hispanics/Latinos can be of any race.

References

External links

Unincorporated communities in Georgetown County, South Carolina
Unincorporated communities in South Carolina